The 1956 Marshall Thundering Herd football team was an American football team that represented Marshall University in the Mid-American Conference (MAC) during the 1956 NCAA College Division football season. In its fourth season under head coach Herb Royer, the team compiled a 3–6 record (2–4 against conference opponents), tied for fourth place out of seven teams in the MAC, and was outscored by a total of 185 to 122. The team played its home games at Fairfield Stadium in Huntington, West Virginia.

Schedule

References

Marshall
Marshall Thundering Herd football seasons
Marshall Thundering Herd football